Radu Ștefăniță Boboc (born 24 April 1999) is a Romanian professional footballer who plays as a full-back.

Career statistics

Club

Honours
Viitorul Constanța
Cupa României: 2018–19
Supercupa României: 2019

References

External links
 
 
 
 
 
 

1999 births
Living people
Sportspeople from Craiova
Romanian footballers
Romania youth international footballers
Romania under-21 international footballers
Association football midfielders
Liga I players
FC Viitorul Constanța players
FCV Farul Constanța players
FC Steaua București players
Olympic footballers of Romania
Footballers at the 2020 Summer Olympics